Shipunovo is a rural locality (a selo) and the administrative center of Shipunovsky Selsoviet of Shipunovsky District, Altai Krai, Russia. The population was 13,462 in 2016. There are 98 streets.

Geography 

The village is located 165 south from Barnaul between Aley and Klepechikha Rivers.

References 

Rural localities in Shipunovsky District